The SPring-8 Angstrom Compact free electron LAser, referred to as SACLA (pronounced さくら (Sa-Ku-Ra)), is an X-ray free-electron laser (XFEL) in Harima Science Garden City, Japan, embedded in the SPring-8 accelerator and synchrotron complex. When it first came into operation 2011, it was the second XFEL in the world and the first in Japan.

Design 

Like other XFELs, SACLA uses self-amplified spontaneous emission to achieve extremely high intensities of X-rays. SACLA uses in-vacuum, short-period undulators, which is one of the unique factors in its design that allows it to achieve sub-Ångstrom wavelengths of 0.6 Å at a relatively much shorter distance of 0.7 km, compared to other similar XFELs like LCLS (2 km) or the European XFEL (3.4 km). An 8.5 GeV electron beam is used as the source.

Animated Short Films 
SACLA has released a number of animated short films to promote its research capabilities to the public. In July 2013, SACLA released two animated short films titled "Picotopia", which discussed the cellular biology, and "Wasureboshi", which is about conception.

On December 3, 2013, another animated short titled "Mirai Koshi: Harima SACLA" was released to promote the XFEL's ability to detect atoms and molecules.

Monkey Affair 
The SACLA "monkey affair" was an incident in 2014 in which a Japanese macaque entered the facility's experimental hutch and was accidentally exposed to a beam of high-energy photons.

According to reports, the macaque had been kept in the facility to aid in research. On the day of the incident, the macaque managed to enter the facility's experimental hutch, which had not been properly secured, and was exposed to the high-energy photon beam for several minutes before escaping the facility. Whether the animal ultimately survived is unknown.

The incident was widely covered in the Japanese media, and drew criticism from animal welfare activists and the general public. The SACLA facility issued a statement apologizing for the incident and promising to take measures to prevent a recurrence.

The use of animals in particle physics research is a topic of ongoing debate. While animal rights activists have criticized the use of animals in such research, scientists argue that it is necessary to advance understanding of subatomic particles and the fundamental laws of the universe.

In response to the incident, SACLA and other facilities have since taken steps to improve the safety and security of their experimental areas and to ensure that animals do not have access to them.

References

Further reading
 SACLA home page
 First Light at SACLA

Free-electron lasers
Synchrotron radiation
Synchrotron-related techniques
X-ray instrumentation
Riken

Harima Science Garden City